The 1939 Green Bay Packers season was their 21st season overall and their 19th season in the National Football League. The Packers finished with a 9–2 record under founder and head coach Curly Lambeau, earning a first-place finish in the Western Conference. Green Bay shut out the New York Giants 27–0 in the NFL Championship Game, earning the franchise's fifth NFL Championship and the first NFL title game shutout ever.

Schedule

Post-season

Standings

Roster

 Frank Balasz #35, FB
 Charles Brock #29, C
 Hank Bruder #5, QB
 Buford "Baby" Ray #44, T
 Larry Buhler #52, FB
 Larry Craig #54, QB
 Paul Engebretsen #34, G
 Milton Gantenbein #22, E
 Charles Goldenberg #43, G
 Tom Greenfield #56, C
John Biolo #32, G

 Arnie Herber #38, HB
 Clarke Hinkle #30, FB
 Don Hutson #14, E
 Cecil Isbell #17, HB
 Harry Jacunski #48, E
 Eddie Jankowski #7, FB
 Paul Kell #41, T
 James Lawrence #51, HB
 Joe Laws #24, HB
 William Lee #40, T

 Willard "Russ" Letlow #46, G
 Allan Moore #55, E
 Carl "Moose" Mulleneaux #19, E
 Lee Mulleneaux #18
 Charles Schultz #60, T
 Ernie Smith #45, T
 Earl "Bud" Svendsen #53, C
 Pete Tinsley #21, G
 Andy Uram #42, HB
 Richard Weisgerber #33, HB
 Gust Zarnas #63, G

Source: "The Green Bay Packers," in Howard Roberts, Who's Who in the Major Leagues Football. Chicago: B.E. Callahan, [1940]; pp. 2–3 and team photo on pg. 24. Illegible jersey digits denoted with X.

Footnotes
Sportsencyclopedia.com

External links
 "1939 Green Bay Packers," Football-Reference.com/.

Green Bay Packers seasons
National Football League championship seasons
Green Bay Packers
Green Bay Packers